Son Mi (born 13 September 1979) is a North Korean table tennis player. She competed in the women's doubles event at the 1996 Summer Olympics.

References

1979 births
Living people
North Korean female table tennis players
Olympic table tennis players of North Korea
Table tennis players at the 1996 Summer Olympics
Place of birth missing (living people)